Rodolfo Bazán (born 14 December 1938) is a Peruvian footballer. He played in five matches for the Peru national football team in 1963. He was also part of Peru's squad for the 1963 South American Championship.

References

External links
 

1938 births
Living people
Peruvian footballers
Peru international footballers
Association football goalkeepers
Footballers from Lima